Thomas Cornell (active between 1780 and 1892 in London) was a London print seller and publisher and a bookseller to the Prince of Wales.

Biography
Cornell published works from premises in Bruton Street between 1790 and 1794. The British Museum holds nearly 150 works issued by him, in particular many by James Sayers and a number of early prints by Thomas Rowlandson, including a depiction of Vincenzo Lunardi carrying his balloon. He published several prints simultaneously with another small publisher Elizabeth Jackson.

References 

Publishers (people) from London